This page lists the winners and nominees for the Black Reel Award for Best Director. Lee Daniels and Steve McQueen are the only directors nominated for Academy Awards. Daniels earned a nomination for Precious and McQueen for 12 Years a Slave.

Winners and nominees
Winners are listed first and highlighted in bold.

2000s

2010s

Multiple nominations and wins

Multiple wins
 2 Wins
 Ava DuVernay
 Steve McQueen
 Gina Prince-Bythewood

Multiple Nominees

 9 Nominations
 Spike Lee

 5 Nominations
 Antoine Fuqua
 Malcolm D. Lee

 4 Nominations
 John Singleton

 3 Nominations
 Ava DuVernay
 Albert Hughes
 Allen Hughes
 Gina Prince-Bythewood
 Tim Story

 2 Nominations
 Salim Akil
 Thomas Carter
 Ryan Coogler
 Lee Daniels
 Rick Famuyiwa
 F Gary Gray
 Sanaa Hamri
 Gary Hardwick
 Steve McQueen
 Charles Stone III
 George Tillman, Jr.

References

Black Reel Awards